Caroline Ouellette  (born May 25, 1979) is a Canadian retired ice hockey player and current associate head coach of the Concordia Stingers women's ice hockey program. She was a member of the Canadian national women's ice hockey team and a member of Canadiennes de Montreal in the Canadian Women's Hockey League. Among her many accomplishments are four Olympic gold medals, 12 IIHF Women's World Championship medals (six gold, six silver), 12 Four Nations Cup medals (eight gold, four silver) and four Clarkson Cup championships.

Ouellette is in the Top 10 in all-time NCAA scoring with 229 career points. She is a member of the Triple Gold Club (not officially recognized by the IIHF for women) as one of only three women to win the Clarkson Cup, an Olympic gold medal and an IIHF Women's World Championship gold medal. Along with teammates Jayna Hefford and Hayley Wickenheiser, Ouellette is one of only five athletes to win gold in four consecutive Olympic games.

Nicknamed Caro by her teammates, she started playing hockey at the age of nine. She is the co-founder of athletichub.com, which helps student-athletes navigate the recruitment process, and an ambassador for Right to Play and Carrément Rose.

Ouellette retired as a player from Canada's national women's team on September 25, 2018. In 2023, she will be inducted into the IIHF Hall of Fame.

Playing career

Ouellette played for Team Quebec at the 1995 Canada Winter Games, and won gold for Canada's Under 18 team in 1997. When the Canadian Under 19 women's hockey team was founded on May 15, 1996, Ouellette was one of the played name to the team. One of her teammates was future Olympic speed skater Cindy Klassen. The head coach was Daniele Sauvageau Ouellette represented Team Quebec at the 1998 Esso women's hockey nationals. She scored a goal and two assists in the bronze medal game, as Team Quebec was awarded the Maureen McTeer Trophy. During the 2011 IIHF Eight Nations Tournament, Ouellette assisted on all three goals as Canada defeated Finland by a 3–2 tally in round robin play. In the gold medal game of the 2011 Four Nations Cup, Ouellette notched a goal in a 4–3 loss. Ouellette has taken part in 3 Olympic Games, 9 World Championships and 9 Four Nations Cups. In 157 international games with Team Canada, Ouellette has racked up 169 points. In a game versus Russia at the 2012 IIHF Women's World Championship, Ouellette logged three assists in a 14–1 victory. Ouellette would score the game-winning goal in overtime versus the United States in the final game at the 2012 IIHF Women's World Championship, as Canada claimed the gold medal.

NCAA
Ouellette attended the University of Minnesota Duluth and played for the Minnesota–Duluth Bulldogs women's ice hockey program. Ouellette set an NCAA record for most shorthanded goals in one game with 2. This was accomplished on November 14, 2003 versus North Dakota. In the 2004–05 season, Ouellette was a factor on more than 60 percent of goals scored by the Bulldogs. Among the top nine scorers on the Bulldogs, she had nine penalties, which were the fewest. Throughout her NCAA career, she never had double digits in penalties. By season's end, she was one of three finalists for the Patty Kazmaier Award.

Ouellette is ranked third in all-time leading scoring in Bulldogs history and was named to the WCHA All-Decade team in 2009. She joined the national team in 1999 and has won four world championships (1999, 2000, 2001 and 2004) and four Olympic gold medals with the team (2002, 2006, 2010 and 2014).

CWHL

During the 2000–01 NWHL season, Ouellette played with the Montreal Wingstar and finished third in league scoring with 53 points. She would also spend one season competing with the Minnesota Whitecaps in the former Western Women's Hockey League. In 2008–09, Ouellette joined the Montreal Stars. She won CWHL Top Scorer of the Month honours in November (tying the league record with 19 points in just six games) and December. At year's end, she was named CWHL Most Valuable Player. By winning a third gold medal in women's Olympic hockey, she became the Bulldog hockey player with the most gold medals.

By winning the 2009 Clarkson Cup, Ouellette became an unofficial member of the Triple Gold Club (the accomplishment by women is not yet officially recognized by the IIHF), as she became one of only three women (at the time) to win the Clarkson Cup, a gold medal in ice hockey at the 2002 Winter Olympics, and a gold medal at the IIHF World Women's Championships.

In 2010–11, Ouellette won the Angela James Bowl as the CWHL's scoring leader with 68 points. She also became the first two-winner of the league's Most Valuable Player award. In the championship game of the 2011 Clarkson Cup, Ouellette led all scorers with three points (one goal, two assists).

On December 11, 2016, Ouellette logged a pair of assists, eclipsing the 300-point mark. Of note, Ouellette became the first player in the history of the CWHL to reach this plateau.

Coaching career
For the 2007–2008 season, Ouellette was an assistant coach with the University of Minnesota Duluth women's hockey team alongside American Olympic ice hockey player Julie Chu. With Hockey Canada, she was an assistant coach for the Women's National Under-18 Team for
a three-game series vs. the US in August 2008. She joined the coaching staff of the Concordia Stingers women's ice hockey program in the autumn of 2012.

Personal life
Ouellette graduated from the University of Minnesota Duluth in 2005 with a degree in criminology and women's studies, and she graduated from the National Police Academy in Quebec in 2000. She played for Quebec in softball at the 1997 Summer Canada Games. On September 11, 2010, the Centre Etienne Desmarteau in Montreal, named one of the two rinks in the arena in Ouellette's honour. Caroline Ouellette is involved in raising funds for the Quebec Breast Cancer Foundation, a disease has affected the Ouellette family. On January 21, 2011, Ouellette, along with University of Minnesota Duluth Bulldog alumni Jenny Potter and Maria Rooth, took part in a ceremonial faceoff to mark the first ever game at Amsoil Arena at her alma mater in Duluth.

She participated in various festivities commemorating the 2012 NHL All-Star Game in Ottawa, Ontario. Said festivities included an interview (along with a fan question and answer period) at the Sirius XM Stage at the Scotiabank NHL Fan Fair, the Energizer Night Skate at the Ottawa Rink of Dreams (relocated from the Rideau Canal), and attended the Molson Canadian NHL All-Star Skills Competition on Saturday, January 28, 2012. On April 17, 2012, Ouellette (along with Meghan Agosta, Gillian Apps, Courtney Birchard, and head coach Dan Church) took part in the opening faceoff of the playoff game between the Ottawa Senators and the New York Rangers at ScotiaBank Place.

Ouellette is married to American hockey player and Olympic silver-medalist Julie Chu. Ouellette and Chu announced the birth of their daughter Liv in November 2017. They welcomed their second child, Tessa, in May 2021.

Career statistics

Regular season and playoffs

International

Awards and honours

Hockey Canada
2019 Hockey Canada Female Breakthrough Award
 Isobel Gathorne-Hardy Award, 2013

CWHL
 Clarkson Cup Top Forward, 2009
 Clarkson Cup Top Scorer, 2009
 CWHL Most Valuable Player, 2008–09 and 2010–11
 CWHL First All-Star Team, 2008–09
 Angela James Bowl, 2010–11

NCAA
Caroline Ouellette, 2003 NCAA Division I Women's Ice Hockey Tournament Most Valuable Player 
 Caroline Ouellette, NCAA leader, 2003–04 season, Points per game, 2.38
 Caroline Ouellette, NCAA leader, 2003–04 season, Assists per game, 1.47
 February 7, 2005: Caroline Ouellette became the third Minnesota Duluth player to be named a Patty Kazmaier Top-10 Finalist for two straight seasons.
 March 3, 2005: Caroline Ouellette is named UMD's first ever WCHA Student-Athlete of the Year, while also earning a spot on the All-WCHA First Team. In addition, she is named to the WCHA All-Academic Team.
 March 6, 2005: Caroline Ouellette is named to the WCHA All-Tournament Team.
 March 14, 2005: Caroline Ouellette becomes the second Bulldog to be named a Patty Kazmaier Top-3 Finalist.
 March 23, 2005: Caroline Ouellette is honored with the USCHO.com Sportsmanship Award and a Second Team selection.
 March 28, 2005: Caroline Ouellette is named a CCM All-America First Team selection for the second straight season.

National honours
 In 2019, she was appointed as an Officer of the Order of Canada. This will give her the Post Nominal Letters "OC" for Life.
 In 2023, she will be inducted into the IIHF Hall of Fame.

References

External links

 Caroline Ouellette website 
  Live The Dream, Caroline Ouellette, Life After the World Championships for Ouellette
   Interview de Caroline Ouellette à la revue Elle Québec

1979 births
Living people
Angela James Bowl winners
Canadian women's ice hockey forwards
Clarkson Cup champions
French Quebecers
Ice hockey people from Montreal
Ice hockey players at the 2002 Winter Olympics
Ice hockey players at the 2006 Winter Olympics
Ice hockey players at the 2010 Winter Olympics
Ice hockey players at the 2014 Winter Olympics
LGBT ice hockey players
Medalists at the 2002 Winter Olympics
Medalists at the 2006 Winter Olympics
Medalists at the 2010 Winter Olympics
Medalists at the 2014 Winter Olympics
Minnesota Duluth Bulldogs women's ice hockey players
Les Canadiennes de Montreal players
Olympic gold medalists for Canada
Olympic ice hockey players of Canada
Olympic medalists in ice hockey
Officers of the Order of Canada
Canadian LGBT sportspeople
21st-century Canadian LGBT people